Lafox is a commune in the Lot-et-Garonne department in south-western France.

Geography
It lies in the Garonne valley on the N113, the road from Bordeaux to Toulouse, to the east of Agen. It is connected to Agen by both the N113 and a cycle path beside the canal.

The Séoune forms most of the commune's north-eastern border, flows west-southwestward through the middle of the commune, forms part of its western border, then flows into the Garonne, which forms the commune's southern border.

See also
Communes of the Lot-et-Garonne department

References

Communes of Lot-et-Garonne